Zero: Fever Part.1 is the fifth extended play (EP) by South Korean boy group Ateez. It was released on July 29, 2020, with "Inception" and "Thanxx" serving as lead singles. The physical album comes in three versions: Thanxx, Inception, and Diary. The album is composed of seven tracks, and incorporates different genres such as dance-pop, trap, hip hop, D&B, reggae, pop rock, and synth-pop.

Commercially, the album debuted atop the Gaon Album Chart, becoming Ateez's third number-one release in South Korea. It also charted on the US Billboard World Albums chart at number 6, with tracks "Inception" and "Thanxx" peaking at numbers 9 and 18, respectively, on the digital songs chart. Ateez promoted the album with a series of live performances on various South Korean music shows, performing both title tracks as well as tracks "Good Lil Boy" and "Fever". Music videos were also released for both "Inception" and "Thanxx," released on July 29 and August 24, respectively. The music videos are the two fastest Ateez music videos to reach 10,000,000 views on YouTube, each achieving the feat in less than 24 hours.

Track listing

Charts

Accolades

References

See also 

 List of 2020 albums
 List of Gaon Album Chart number ones of 2020

2020 EPs
Ateez albums